NDL-40 (also called LAU 97) is a towed multiple rocket launcher developed and produced by IPTN (now PT DI) of Indonesia. The weapon system used 70mm (2.75 inch) rockets as projectile. The rocket used is produced by IPTN under license from Belgium.

The system can fire 40 rockets from launcher tubes in a single, ripple, or salvo modes with an interval of 0.1 to 9.9 seconds for each rocket. The system is capable of devastating an area of 200x300 meters in a salvo. Maximum range is only about 6 km for rockets with MK-40 motor, but can be increased to 8 km by using rockets with FZ-68 motor.

See also 

 Type 63 MRL
 List of rocket artillery

References 

Multiple rocket launchers
Rocket artillery
Field artillery
Weapons of Indonesia